Juan Carlos Carcedo Mardones (born 19 August 1973) is a Spanish football manager and former player who played as a midfielder.

He amassed Segunda División totals of 134 matches and four goals over seven seasons, mainly with Atlético Madrid B and Leganés. He subsequently worked as an assistant manager, always under Unai Emery.

Playing career
Born in Logroño, La Rioja, Carcedo began his career at CE L'Hospitalet in Segunda División B, making his debut in the competition on 5 September 1993 in a 3–3 draw at Gimnàstic de Tarragona and being sent off in the 85th minute. He played a 31 further matches during that season, earning a second dismissal on 10 October in a 1–1 home draw against UE Rubí.

In the summer of 1996, after one-year spells in the lower leagues with UDA Gramenet and RCD Espanyol B – scoring his first goal as a senior on 18 September 1994 to open a 3–1 win for the former over CD Alcoyano– Carcedo signed for Atlético Madrid, being assigned to the reserves in Segunda División. In the 2000–01 campaign he appeared in 16 competitive games for the first team (on loan from French side OGC Nice) as they also competed at that level, the first one being a 0–1 league home loss to Recreativo de Huelva on 9 September 2000 in which he started.

Carcedo then moved to another club in the capital, CD Leganés, where he played three years in the second tier. He retired after a couple of seasons in the third with UD Las Palmas, earning promotion in the latter but only contributing four games to the feat.

Coaching career
On retiring, Carcedo became assistant manager to Unai Emery at UD Almería. Despite being offered the main position at the club, he left and followed Emery to Valencia CF in 2008. In 2012, they worked together at Russia's FC Spartak Moscow.

The pair returned to Spain the following year, being appointed at Sevilla FC. On 10 May 2015, Carcedo was put in charge of the team for their match away to RC Celta de Vigo following the death of Emery's father Juan, and he managed a 1–1 draw.

In June 2016, Carcedo was one of several staff members who accompanied Emery to French title-holders Paris Saint-Germain FC. Two years later, after winning seven trophies, both left for Arsenal in the English Premier League.

Carcedo had his first coaching experience in his own right in August 2020, when he was appointed at UD Ibiza of the third division for two years. On 24 June 2021, after leading the side to their first-ever promotion to the second tier, he renewed his contract until 2023.

On 18 December 2021, after six matches without winning, Carcedo was dismissed. During 1 and half seasons, UD Ibiza have got 25 wins, 15 draws and 11 losses. They ended the first round of the season at the same distance from the playoff zone that from the relegation zone. 
 The following 31 May, he was appointed at the helm of Real Zaragoza also in division two, but on 6 November 2022 the Club decided to renew the sports area as a whole. He left the club in the 16th position of the classification table (there are 22 in total) .

Managerial statistics

References

External links

1973 births
Living people
Sportspeople from Logroño
Spanish footballers
Footballers from La Rioja (Spain)
Association football midfielders
Segunda División players
Segunda División B players
CE L'Hospitalet players
UDA Gramenet footballers
RCD Espanyol B footballers
Atlético Madrid B players
Atlético Madrid footballers
CD Leganés players
UD Las Palmas players
Ligue 2 players
OGC Nice players
Spanish expatriate footballers
Expatriate footballers in France
Spanish expatriate sportspeople in France
Spanish football managers
Segunda División managers
Segunda División B managers
UD Ibiza managers
Real Zaragoza managers
Sevilla FC non-playing staff
Paris Saint-Germain F.C. non-playing staff
Arsenal F.C. non-playing staff
Spanish expatriate sportspeople in Russia
Spanish expatriate sportspeople in England